The 1932 Southern Conference men's basketball tournament took place from February 26–27, 1932 and February 29–March 1, 1932 at Municipal Auditorium in Atlanta, Georgia. The Georgia Bulldogs won their first Southern Conference title, led by head coach Rex Enright.

Format
The top sixteen finishers of the conference's twenty-three members were eligible for the tournament. Mississippi and South Carolina did not participate. The tournament was seeded so that no team would face a school that they had faced in the regular season in the first round of the tournament.

Bracket

* Overtime game
Games were not played on Sunday to observe the Sabbath.

Championship

All-Southern tournament team

See also
List of Southern Conference men's basketball champions

References

Tournament
Southern Conference men's basketball tournament
Southern Conference men's basketball tournament
Southern Conference men's basketball tournament
Southern Conference men's basketball tournament